The 21st Producers Guild of America Awards (also known as 2010 Producers Guild Awards), honoring the best film and television producers of 2009, were held at Hollywood Palladium in Hollywood, California on January 24, 2010. The nominations were announced on November 30, 2009 and January 5, 2010.

Winners and nominees

Film
{| class=wikitable style="width="100%"
|-
! colspan="2" style="background:#abcdef;"| Darryl F. Zanuck Award for Outstanding Producer of Theatrical Motion Pictures
|-
| colspan="2" style="vertical-align:top;"|
 The Hurt Locker – Kathryn Bigelow, Mark Boal, Nicolas Chartier, and Greg Shapiro Avatar – James Cameron and Jon Landau
 District 9 – Peter Jackson and Carolynne Cunningham
 An Education – Finola Dwyer and Amanda Posey
 Inglourious Basterds – Lawrence Bender
 Invictus – Clint Eastwood, Lori McCreary, Robert Lorenz, and Mace Neufeld
 Precious – Lee Daniels, Sarah Siegel-Magness, and Gary Magness
 Star Trek – J. J. Abrams and Damon Lindelof
 Up – Jonas Rivera
 Up in the Air – Ivan Reitman, Jason Reitman, and Daniel Dubiecki
|-
! colspan="2" style="background:#abcdef;"| Outstanding Producer of Animated Theatrical Motion Pictures
|-
| colspan="2" style="vertical-align:top;"|
 Up – Jonas Rivera 9 – Timur Bekmambetov, Tim Burton, and Jim Lemley
 Coraline – Bill Mechanic, Mary Sandell, Henry Selick, and Claire Jennings
 Fantastic Mr. Fox – Allison Abbate, Scott Rudin, and Wes Anderson
 The Princess and the Frog – Peter Del Vecho
|-
! colspan="2" style="background:#abcdef;"| Outstanding Producer of Documentary Theatrical Motion Pictures
|-
| colspan="2" style="vertical-align:top;"|
 The Cove – Fisher Stevens and Paula DuPré Pesmen Burma VJ – Lise Lense-Møller 
 Sergio – John Battsek, Greg Barker, and Julie Goldman
 Soundtrack for a Revolution – Joslyn Barnes, Jim Czarnecki, Bill Guttentag, Dan Sturman, and Dylan Nelson
|}

Television

David O. Selznick Achievement Award in Theatrical Motion PicturesJohn LasseterMilestone AwardAmy Pascal and Michael LyntonNorman Lear Achievement Award in TelevisionMark BurnettStanley Kramer Award
Awarded to the motion picture that best illuminates social issues.Precious: Based on the Novel "Push" by Sapphire

Vanguard Award
Awarded in recognition of outstanding achievement in new media and technology.
Joss Whedon

References 

2009 film awards
2009 television awards
2009 guild awards
 2009